Terrell Gomez (born February 5, 1998) is an American professional basketball player who last played for JDA Dijon Basket of the LNB Pro A. He played college basketball for Cal State Northridge and San Diego State.

Early life and high school career
Gomez attended Inglewood High School. As a junior and senior, he earned Daily Breeze all-area honors. Gomez was a three-time All-Bay League selection as well as the league's Most Outstanding Player in 2015 and was named to the All-CIF Division I-AA Team in 2014. He had scholarship offers from Oral Roberts and Liberty, but both were rescinded when both schools had coaching changes. Gomez decided to attend Middlebrooks Academy as a postgraduate student and took classes at East Los Angeles College. He committed to play college basketball for Cal State Northridge.

College career
Gomez averaged 11.7 points, 3.6 assists and 2.4 rebounds per game as a freshman. He was named Big West Freshman of the Year. As a sophomore, Gomez averaged 19.2 points, 2.1 rebounds and 2.8 assists per game. He was named to the First Team All-Big West. On November 13, 2019, Gomez scored a career-high 33 points in a 94–82 loss to Pepperdine. As a junior, he averaged 19.8 points, 2.5 rebounds, and 2.3 assists per game while shooting 43.9 percent from the field, 44 percent from three-point range, and a Division I-leading 94.8 percent from the free throw line. Gomez joined teammate Lamine Diane on the First Team All-Big West, becoming the first pair of Cal State Northridge players to be named to the first team twice. He transferred to San Diego State for his senior season. As a senior, Gomez averaged 8.6 points, 1.5 rebounds, and 2.3 assists per game. He declined to take the NCAA's granting of an additional year of eligibility, instead opting to turn professional.

Professional career
On July 13, 2021, Gomez signed his first professional contract with Final Spor of the Turkish Basketball First League. He averaged 21.6 points, 3.8 assists and 3.4 rebounds per game.

On February 22, 2022, Gomez signed with JDA Dijon Basket of the LNB Pro A and the Basketball Champions League.

Personal life
His brother, DaShawn Gomez, played basketball at Iona.

His parents are from Trinidad and Tobago.

References

External links
Cal State Northridge Matadors bio
San Diego State Aztecs bio

1998 births
Living people
American men's basketball players
American expatriate basketball people in Turkey
American sportspeople of Trinidad and Tobago descent
Basketball players from Los Angeles
Cal State Northridge Matadors men's basketball players
JDA Dijon Basket players
Point guards
San Diego State Aztecs men's basketball players